Andrea Zorzi (born 29 July 1965 in Noale, province of Venice) is a former Italian volleyball player, who won two World Championships with the Italy men's national volleyball team (1990 and 1994). A 201 cm athlete, Zorzi was en effective spiker playing usually as opposite hitter. He was popularly known as Zorro.

After his debut in Bormio in 1986, he totalled 325 caps with Italian national team. He was a silver medalist in the 1996 Summer Olympics and also competed at the 1988 and 1992 games.

Playing for almost all the major volleyball clubs of Italy, including Maxicono Parma and Sisley Treviso, he won several titles: these include two Italian Championships (1990, 1996) and one European Champions League in 1995. In 1991 he was declared World's Best Player by FIVB.
Zorzi 328 apps for national team of italy.

Clubs

Individual awards
 1990 FIVB World League "Most Valuable Player"
 1991 FIVB World League "Most Valuable Player"
 1992 FIVB World League "Best Server"

References

External links 
 
 

1965 births
Living people
Sportspeople from the Metropolitan City of Venice
Olympic volleyball players of Italy
Olympic silver medalists for Italy
Italian men's volleyball players
Volleyball players at the 1988 Summer Olympics
Volleyball players at the 1992 Summer Olympics
Volleyball players at the 1996 Summer Olympics
Olympic medalists in volleyball
Medalists at the 1996 Summer Olympics